Karim Shehab (born 9 September 1967) is an Australian former handball player. He competed in the men's tournament at the 2000 Summer Olympics.

References

External links
 

1967 births
Living people
Australian male handball players
Olympic handball players of Australia
Handball players at the 2000 Summer Olympics
People from the Riverina
Sportsmen from New South Wales